The 2018 Texas Tech Red Raiders baseball team represented Texas Tech University during the 2018 NCAA Division I baseball season. The Red Raiders played their home games at Dan Law Field at Rip Griffin Park as a member of the Big 12 Conference. The team was led by 6th year head coach Tim Tadlock.

Previous season
The 2017 Texas Tech Red Raiders baseball team finished the regular season with a 42–13 (16–8) record and tied with TCU for first place in the Big 12 Conference standings. The Red Raiders were eliminated from the 2017 Big 12 Conference baseball tournament in game 3 after a 7–12 loss to West Virginia. Tech received a bid to the 2017 NCAA Division I baseball tournament, losing to Sam Houston State in games 3 and 4 of the regionals.

Personnel

Roster

Schedule and results

"#" represents ranking. All rankings from Collegiate Baseball on the date of the contest.
"()" represents postseason seeding in the Big 12 tournament or NCAA Regional, respectively.

NCAA tournament

Lubbock Regional

Lubbock Super Regional

College World Series

First round

Second round

Rankings

References

Texas Tech Red Raiders
Texas Tech Red Raiders baseball seasons
Texas Tech
College World Series seasons